South West Africa was a territory under South African administration from 1915 to 1990, after which it became modern-day Namibia. It bordered Angola (Portuguese colony before 1975), Botswana (Bechuanaland before 1966), South Africa, and Zambia (Northern Rhodesia before 1964).

Originally the German colony of the same name from 1884 to 1915, it was made a League of Nations mandate of the Union of South Africa following Germany's defeat in the First World War. Although the mandate was abolished by the United Nations in 1966, South African control over the territory continued despite its illegality under international law. The territory was administered directly by the South African government from 1915 to 1978, when the Turnhalle Constitutional Conference laid the groundwork for semi-autonomous rule. During an interim period between 1978 and 1985, South Africa gradually granted South West Africa a limited form of home rule, culminating in the formation of a Transitional Government of National Unity.

In 1990, South West Africa was granted independence as the Republic of Namibia with the exception of Walvis Bay and the Penguin Islands, which continued to remain under South African rule until 1994.

German colony

As a German colony from 1884, it was known as German South West Africa (Deutsch-Südwestafrika). Germany had a difficult time administering the territory, which experienced many insurrections against the harsh German rule, especially those led by guerilla leader Jacob Morenga. The main port, Walvis Bay, and the Penguin Islands were annexed by the UK in 1878, becoming part of the Cape Colony in 1884. Following the creation of the Union of South Africa in 1910, Walvis Bay became part of the Cape Province.

As part of the Heligoland–Zanzibar Treaty in 1890, a corridor of land taken from the northern border of Bechuanaland, extending as far as the Zambezi River, was added to the colony. It was named the Caprivi Strip (Caprivizipfel) after the German Chancellor Leo von Caprivi.

South African rule
In 1915, during the South West Africa campaign of World War I, South Africa captured the German colony. After the war, it was declared a League of Nations Class C Mandate territory under the Treaty of Versailles, with the Union of South Africa responsible for the administration of South West Africa. From 1922, this included Walvis Bay, which, under the South West Africa Affairs Act, was governed as if it were part of the mandated territory. South West Africa remained a League of Nations Mandate until World War II and  the collapse of the League of Nations.

The Mandate was supposed to become a United Nations Trust Territory when League of Nations Mandates were transferred to the United Nations following World War II. The Prime Minister, Jan Smuts, objected to South West Africa coming under UN control and refused to allow the territory's transition to independence, instead seeking to make it South Africa's fifth province in 1946.

Although this never occurred, in 1949, the South West Africa Affairs Act was amended to give representation in the Parliament of South Africa to whites in South West Africa, which gave them six seats in the House of Assembly and four in the Senate.

This was to the advantage of the National Party, which enjoyed strong support from the predominantly Afrikaner and ethnic German white population in the territory. Between 1950 and 1977, all of South West Africa's parliamentary seats were held by the National Party.

An additional consequence of this was the extension of apartheid laws to the territory. This gave rise to several rulings at the International Court of Justice, which in 1950 ruled that South Africa was not obliged to convert South West Africa into a UN trust territory, but was still bound by the League of Nations Mandate, with the United Nations General Assembly assuming the supervisory role. The ICJ also clarified that the General Assembly was empowered to receive petitions from the inhabitants of South West Africa and to call for reports from the mandatory nation, South Africa. The General Assembly constituted the Committee on South West Africa to perform the supervisory functions.

In another Advisory Opinion issued in 1955, the Court further ruled that the General Assembly was not required to follow League of Nations voting procedures in determining questions concerning South West Africa. In 1956, the Court further ruled that the Committee had the power to grant hearings to petitioners from the mandated territory. In 1960, Ethiopia and Liberia filed a case in the International Court of Justice against South Africa alleging that South Africa had not fulfilled its mandatory duties. This case did not succeed, with the Court ruling in 1966 that they were not the proper parties to bring the case.

Mandate terminated

There was a protracted struggle between South Africa and forces fighting for independence, particularly after the formation of the South West Africa People's Organisation (SWAPO) in 1960.

In 1966, the General Assembly passed resolution 2145 (XXI) which declared the Mandate terminated and that the Republic of South Africa had no further right to administer South West Africa. In 1971, acting on a request for an Advisory Opinion from the United Nations Security Council, the ICJ ruled that the continued presence of South Africa in Namibia was illegal and that South Africa was under an obligation to withdraw from Namibia immediately. It also ruled that all member states of the United Nations were under an obligation not to recognise as valid any act performed by South Africa on behalf of Namibia.

South West Africa became known as Namibia by the UN when the General Assembly changed the territory's name by Resolution 2372 (XXII) of 12 June 1968. SWAPO was recognised as representative of the Namibian people, and gained UN observer status when the territory of South West Africa was already removed from the list of non-self-governing territories.

In 1977, South Africa transferred control of Walvis Bay back to the Cape Province, thereby making it an exclave.

The territory became the independent Republic of Namibia on 21 March 1990, although Walvis Bay and the Penguin Islands remained under South African control until 1994.

Bantustans
The South African authorities established 10 bantustans in South West Africa in the late 1960s and early 1970s in accordance with the Odendaal Commission, three of which were granted self-rule. These bantustans were replaced with separate ethnicity based governments in 1980.

Self-governing entities

Non-self-governing entities

See also
List of colonial governors of South West Africa
History of Namibia
South West African People's Organisation (SWAPO)
South West African Territorial Force (SWATF)
South West African Police (SWAPOL)
South African Border War

References

Notes

Citations

Further reading
 Molly McCullers, Betwixt and Between Colony and Nation-State: Liminality, Decolonization, and the South West Africa Mandate, The American Historical Review, Volume 124, Issue 5, December 2019, Pages 1704–1708.

 
History of Namibia
Former countries in Africa
South West Africa
Namibia–South Africa relations
Namibia and the Commonwealth of Nations
States and territories established in 1915
States and territories disestablished in 1990
1915 establishments in South West Africa
1990 disestablishments in Namibia
White supremacy in Africa